Isho'yahb may refer to:

 Isho'yahb I (fl. 581-596), patriarch
 Yeshuyab II (fl. 620-644), also Isho'yahb II of Gdala (628-45), Christian patriarch
 Ishoyahb III, (fl. 649-659), patriarch
 Isho'yahb IV (fl. 1020-1025)
 Isho'yahb V (fl. 1148-1176)
 Mar Eliyya XIII Isho-Yab (fl. 1778-1804)

 Bishops in Adiabene (East Syrian Ecclesiastical Province)
 Ishoy'yahb of Shenna, contemporary of Isho'yahb II of Gdala
 Ishoʿyahb of Haditha, metropolitan of Mosul during the reign of the patriarch Mari (987–99)

See also
 List of patriarchs of the Church of the East